A local enterprise company (LEC) is a public-sector organisation in Scotland with responsibility for local economic development activities. The LECs form part of the two enterprise networks, Scottish Enterprise and Highlands and Islands Enterprise.

Highlands and Islands Enterprise LECs
Argyll and the Islands Enterprise (AIE), covering most of Argyll and Bute (excluding the Helensburgh area), plus Arran, Great Cumbrae and Little Cumbrae
Caithness and Sutherland Enterprise (CASE)
Inverness, Nairn, Badenoch and Strathspey Enterprise (INBSE)
Lochaber Enterprise
HIE Moray
Orkney Enterprise
Ross and Cromarty Enterprise (RACE)
Skye and Lochalsh Enterprise (SALE) 
Shetland Enterprise
Western Isles Enterprise (WIE)

Scottish Enterprise LECs
Previously autonomous, the Scottish Enterprise LECs are now fully integrated into the main organisation, and act as branch offices in the following areas: 
 Ayrshire 
 Borders 
 Dumfries and Galloway 
 Dunbartonshire 
 Edinburgh and Lothian 
 Fife 
 Forth Valley 
 Glasgow 
 Grampian 
 Lanarkshire 
 Renfrewshire 
 Tayside

Economy of Scotland
Public bodies of the Scottish Government
Administrative divisions of Scotland